Foti is a surname. Notable people with the surname include:

Adam Foti, Australian football player
Antonino Foti, Italian sports coach
Charles Foti, American jurist and Attorney General of Louisiana
Pasquale Foti, Italian businessman
Salvatore Foti, Italian footballer
Samu Fóti, Hungarian gymnast
Steven Foti, American politician

See also
 Fo-ti, the herb Reynoutria multiflora